The 1959 German Grand Prix was a Formula One motor race held at the Automobil-Verkehrs- und Übungs-Straße in West Berlin on 2 August 1959. It was race 6 of 9 in the 1959 World Championship of Drivers and race 5 of 8 in the 1959 International Cup for Formula One Manufacturers. It was the 21st German Grand Prix and was only the second time the race was not held at the Nürburgring. AVUS had previously held the original German Grand Prix in 1926. The race was held over two 30 lap heats of the eight kilometre circuit for a total race distance of 498 kilometres.

In a unique Formula One race format, first, second and third were all claimed by the same team, Scuderia Ferrari. British driver Tony Brooks was declared the winner ahead of American teammates Dan Gurney and Phil Hill. All three drove Ferrari Dino 246s.

Race report 

The simplistic track consisted of a very fast straight down either side of a dual carriageway, punctuated at one end by a hairpin and at the other by a steep banking.

Also uniquely in Formula One World Championship history, the race was divided into two heats. In the first, Tony Brooks and Dan Gurney took the lead. Masten Gregory in the Cooper-Climax battled hard with them, passing first one Ferrari then the other as the lead changed hands until a big end bolt broke. It was a Ferrari 1-2-3 with Phil Hill taking the final podium place. In the second heat, once again the Ferraris had a duel at the front, this time with Bruce McLaren until he suffered transfer gear problems. On aggregate placings, it was an all-Ferrari podium in the order Brooks, Gurney, Hill. Maurice Trintignant was fourth from Jo Bonnier and Ian Burgess. This was the fastest Formula One race recorded at this time, with an average speed of 143.3 miles per hour. Hans Herrmann crashed his BRM P25 five laps into the second heat. In the approach to the southern turn he struck hay bales and rolled his car, but was thrown clear and sent sliding down the track. While the car was destroyed, Herrmann escaped unscathed. Because of this incredible luck Herrmann got his nickname 'Hans im Glück'.

Former Ferrari driver Frenchman Jean Behra was due to race his Behra-Porsche Special in the Grand Prix but Behra was killed the day before racing a Porsche RSK in the Formula 2 support race at the same venue.

The results show evidence of the inconsistency with which rules were applied in this era. According to Formula One rules of the day, those drivers who retired before the end of the Grand Prix should only be classified if they pushed the car over the line after the finish. This rule was not applied to Harry Schell, who retired some 11 laps before the end. However, the rule was applied in other races, such as the 1960 Belgian Grand Prix. The rules were later clarified in 1966.

Brooks' win allowed him to close to within four points of championship leader, Australian Cooper racer Jack Brabham.

Classification

Qualifying 

 — Cliff Allison and Ian Burgess were listed as reserve drivers for the race. They were only allowed to start the race after Porsche withdrew following Jean Behra's fatal accident. They started from the back of the grid.

Race 

Notes
 – Includes 1 point for fastest lap

Championship standings after the race

Drivers' Championship standings

Constructors' Championship standings

 Notes: Only the top five positions are included for both sets of standings.

References 

German Grand Prix
German Grand Prix
German Grand Prix